The Northeast Operating Rules Advisory Committee (NORAC) is a body of railroads that establish a set of operating rules for railroads in North America. The NORAC rulebook is used by full and associate member railroads, located mostly in the Northeast United States.

Members

Full members

Amtrak (AMTK)
Conrail Shared Assets Operations (CR)
CSX Transportation (CSXT)
Keolis Commuter Services: Boston (KCS)
New Jersey Transit Rail Operations (NJTR)
New York, Susquehanna and Western Railway Corp. (NYSW)
Norfolk Southern (NS)
Southeastern Pennsylvania Transportation Authority (SEPTA)

Associate members

Adirondack Scenic Railroad (ADIX)
Adrian and Blissfield Railroad (ABDF)
Bay Colony Railroad (BCLR)
Buckingham Branch Railroad (BB)
Cape Cod Central Railroad
Cape May Seashore Lines (CMSL)
Central New England Railroad (CNZR)
Central Railroad Company of Indiana (CIND)
Central Railroad Company of Indianapolis (CERA)
Chesapeake and Delaware LLC
Connecticut Southern Railroad (CSO)
C&S Railroad Corporation
East Jersey Railroad & Terminal Co. (EJR)
Finger Lakes Railway (FGLK)
Flats Industrial Railroad (FIR)
Fore River Transportation Corporation (FRVT)
Genesee Valley Transportation (GVT)
Housatonic Railroad Company (HRRC)
Indiana Harbor Belt Railroad (IHB)
Luzerne and Susquehanna Railway (LS)
Maine Eastern Railroad (MERR)
Massachusetts Central Railroad (MCER)
Massachusetts Coastal Railroad (MC)
Milford-Bennington Railroad (MBRX)
Morristown and Erie Railway (ME)
Mountain Division Railway Corporation
Narragansett Bay Railroad Company
National Park Service
Naugatuck Railroad Company (NAUG)
New Hope and Ivyland Railroad (NHRR)
New York and Greenwood Lake Railway (NYGL)
New York New Jersey Rail, LLC (NYNJ)
North Shore Railroad (NSHR)
Northern Central Railway (NCRY)
Owego & Hartford Railway, Inc. (OHRY)
Pennsylvania Northeastern Railroad (PNE) 
Plymouth & Lincoln Railroad
Port Jersey Railroad (PJR)
Raritan Central Railway (RCRY)
Seaview Transportation Company (SVTX)
Seminole Gulf Railway (SGLR)
SMS Rail Service (SLRS)
Somerset Railroad (SOM)
Southern New Jersey Rail Group (NJ Transit RiverLINE)
Southern Railroad of New Jersey (SRNJ)
Springfield Terminal Railway Company, d/b/a Pan Am Railways (ST)
Valley Railroad (VALE)
West Chester Railroad (WCRL)
Winamac Southern Railway (WSRY)
Winnipesaukee Scenic Railroad

Overview
The NORAC rules are intended to enhance railroad safety. The rules cover employee responsibilities, signaling equipment, procedures for safe train movement, dealing with accidents and other topics that directly and indirectly affect railroad safety.

These rules govern operation on main lines, defined as those with some form of block control system.

The 10th edition of the NORAC operating rules went into effect on November 6, 2011.

The 11th edition of the NORAC operating rules went into effect on February 1, 2018.

History
In January 1985, six railroads (Conrail, Amtrak, Metro-North, New Jersey Transit, Southeastern Pennsylvania Transportation Authority, and Delaware & Hudson) met in Newark, New Jersey with the goal to create a common operating rulebook. In May 1985, a second meeting was held, with eight railroads present, five of the original six (Metro-North withdrew) plus Providence and Worcester, Long Island Rail Road, and Boston & Maine.

The first rulebook was released in January 1987. It contained rules for three types of train control: automatic block (ABS), manual block (MBS), and voice (VCS). The MBS and VCS systems were both governed by NORAC's Form D, which is a train order transmitted directly to the train.

In 1993 the fourth edition combined the MBS and VCS rules into a single "Form D Control System" (DCS).

Categories
The full set of NORAC rules is divided into 25 categories.

Terminology, Definitions and Authorized Abbreviations
General Rules
Reporting for Duty
Miscellaneous Signals
Tampering
Inspection of Equipment
Movement of Trains
Protection of Trains
Movement Permit Form D
General Signal Rules
Signal Aspects and Indications
Form D Control System
Automatic Block Signal System
Cab Signal System
Interlockings and Controlled Points
Radios and Telephones
Movement of Track Cars
Dispatchers
Operators
Train Service Employees
Engine Service Employees
Yardmasters
Station Masters and Assistant Station Masters
Foremen and Track Car Drivers
Form D Illustration

See also
General Code of Operating Rules

References

External links
NORAC: Northeast Operating Rules Advisory Committee
U S Department of Transportation - Compliance with Railroad Operating Rules and Corporate Culture Influences, October 1999

Railway signaling in the United States
Rail transportation in North America